Kelburn may refer to:

Kelburn Castle, Scottish castle
Kelburn, New Zealand, suburb of Wellington